Hawar Kilis (or ), alternatively spelled Hiwar Kalas, is a village in northern Aleppo Governorate, northwestern Syria.

The village administratively belongs to Nahiya Sawran in Azaz District. Nearby localities include Zayzafun  to the west and Baraghida  to the south.

Demographics
In the 2004 census, Hawar Kilis had a population of 438. In late 19th century, traveler Martin Hartmann noted Hawar as a Turkish village of 10 houses, then located in the Ottoman nahiyah of Azaz-i Turkman.

See also
Hawar Kilis Operations Room

References

Turkmen communities in Syria
Populated places in Azaz District
Syria–Turkey relations